The Cinéma L'Amour is an adult movie theatre in Saint Laurent Boulevard in Montreal, Canada. The building it occupies was formerly the Globe vaudeville hall, opened in 1914. The cinema first started showing pornographic films in 1969, renaming itself the Pussycat, before adopting the current name in 1981.

In addition to pornographic films, its programming has sometimes included grindhouse films.

References

External links 
 

Cinemas and movie theatres in Montreal
Adult movie theaters
1969 establishments in Quebec